Julie Daigneault (born June 25, 1965) is a former competition swimmer from Canada who specialized in middle-distance freestyle events.  Daigneault competed for her native country at the 1984 Summer Olympics in Los Angeles, California.  There she finished in 8th position in the women's 400-metre freestyle and 9th in the 200-metre freestyle.  She won three bronze medals at the 1983 Pan American Games in Edmonton, Alberta – in the 200, 400 and 800-metre freestyle events.

References
 Canadian Olympic Committee

1965 births
Living people
Canadian female freestyle swimmers
Olympic swimmers of Canada
Sportspeople from Quebec
Swimmers at the 1983 Pan American Games
Swimmers at the 1984 Summer Olympics
Pan American Games bronze medalists for Canada
Pan American Games medalists in swimming
Universiade medalists in swimming
Universiade bronze medalists for Canada
Medalists at the 1983 Summer Universiade
Medalists at the 1983 Pan American Games
20th-century Canadian women
21st-century Canadian women